Sunil Pal is an Indian comedian, actor and voice actor. He was the winner of the series The Great Indian Laughter Challenge. He has played comic roles in various Bollywood films.

In 2010, he wrote and directed a comedy film, Bhavnao Ko Samjho, which featured 51 stand-up comedians including Siraj Khan, Johnny Lever, Raju Srivastav, Kapil Sharma, Navin Prabhakar, Ahsaan Qureshi, Sudesh lehri and many more.

Early life 
Sunil Pal was born in 1975 in a Middle class Marathi speaking family in Mursa village in Bhadravati Taluka of  Chandrapur district, 
Maharashtra. His father was an employee in Indian Railways. He studied in Janata Vidyalaya city branch school, Balharshah. He came to Mumbai in 1995 when his father got transferred. He joined the Junior College. There he used to mimic his professors and famous actors. After college, he struggled for three years.

Career

Early career 
During one of his interviews, he said that "I was working at a tea stall in Santacruz as waiter. Those days I'd sleep on the footpath and I used to use the telephones of a nearby shop to keep in touch with my contacts in film industry."

In 2000, Sunil got a chance to do a world tour with Aamir Khan for Lagaan as a junior artist. He was also involved in other tours of famous actors like Priety Zinta and Aishwarya Rai.

The Great Indian Laughter Challenge 
Later Sunil Pal contested in The Great Indian Laughter Challenge, and won the competition. He was the favourite of viewers, who were enthralled by his remarkable ability of impersonating many film actors (like Sunil Shetty, Nana Patekar, Sunny Deol, Dharmendra, Naseeruddin Shah, and Irrfan Khan) with commanding progress. In addition, his self-created character of the drunkard "Ratan Noora" was widely admired.

Films 
His first major Hindi film, Bombay to Goa released in 2007, although he has played small roles in Hum Tum (2004) and Phir Hera Pheri (2006).  He has also worked in Apna Sapna Money Money and he has produced, written, and directed a film called Bhavnao ko Samjho. The film is in the Guinness Book of World Records for a record 51 stand up comedians acting in a single film.

Filmography

Films

Television

Radio

References

External links
 
 

Living people
People from Wardha district
21st-century Indian male actors
Indian male voice actors
Indian male comedians
Indian stand-up comedians
Male actors in Hindi cinema
Male actors from Maharashtra
1975 births